The Football NSW 2017 season was the fifth season of football in New South Wales under the banner of the National Premier Leagues. The competition consisted of four divisions across the state of New South Wales. The Premiers of the NPL NSW Men's 1 qualified for the national finals, playing-off to decide the champion of the 2017 National Premier Leagues.

League Tables

2017 National Premier League NSW Men's 1

The National Premier League New South Wales 2017 season was played over 22 rounds, with the regular season from March to August 2017.

Finals

Top scorers

2017 National Premier League NSW Men's 2

The 2017 National Premier League NSW Men's 2 was the fifth edition of the NPL NSW 2 as the second level domestic association football competition in New South Wales. 14 teams competed, playing each other twice for a total of 26 rounds, with the top team at the end of the year promoted to the NPL NSW Men's 1 competition.

Finals

2017 National Premier League NSW Men's 3

The 2017 National Premier League NSW Men's 3 was the fifth edition of the NPL NSW Men's 3 under the National Premier Leagues banner. 14 teams competed, playing each other twice for a total of 26 rounds.

Finals

2017 NSW State League

The 2017 NSW State League was the fifth edition of the State League under the National Premier Leagues banner. 10 teams competed, playing each other twice for a total of 18 matches.

Finals

2017 National Premier League NSW Women's 1

The 2017 National Premier League NSW Women's 1 was the fourth edition of the NPL NSW Women's competition to be incorporated under the National Premier Leagues banner. 10 teams competed, playing each other twice for a total of 18 rounds.

Finals

2017 Waratah Cup

Football NSW soccer clubs competed in 2017 for the Waratah Cup. The tournament doubled as the NSW qualifier for the 2017 FFA Cup, with the top five clubs progressing to the Round of 32, as well as the reigning National Premier Leagues champion (Sydney United 58). 147 clubs entered the qualifying phase, with the clubs entering in a staggered format.

The competition was won by Hakoah Sydney City East, their 7th title, defeating APIA Leichhardt Tigers.

In addition to the three A-League clubs (Central Coast Mariners, Sydney FC and Western Sydney Wanderers), the six qualifiers (APIA Leichhardt Tigers, Bankstown Berries, Blacktown City, Hakoah Sydney City East, Hills Brumbies and Sydney United 58) competed in the final rounds of the 2017 FFA Cup.

Awards 
The end of year awards were presented at Oatlands House on 15 September 2017.

National Premier Leagues NSW

Other awards

References

2017 in Australian soccer